Ombilin Stadium is a football stadium  in Sawahlunto, West Sumatra, It is currently used mostly for Football matches and is the home stadium of PS GAS Sawahlunto. Ombilin stadium has a seating capacity of 5,000. The stadium is managed by the Government of Sawahlunto, inside the stadium there is a grocery store. Office radio Sawahlunto FM and offices Persatuan Wartawan Indonesia branch Sawahlunto is also present in this stadium complex.

Tournament

Buildings and structures in West Sumatra
Football venues in Indonesia
Sawahlunto